Jambudi is a village near the Bhuj, the taluka of Kutch district in the Indian state of Gujarat.  It is located at a distance of about 20 km from Bhuj Taluka and district headquarters of Kutch.

History

The village is one of the 19 villages founded by Kutch Gurjar Kshatriyas or Mistris. These Mistris first moved in to Kutch early 7th century and established themselves at Dhaneti. Later in the 10th century onwards they moved between Anjar and Bhuj and founded the villages of Anjar, Sinugra, Khambhra, Nagalpar, Khedoi, Madhapar, Hajapar, Kukma, Galpadar, Reha, Vidi, Ratnal, Jambudi, Devaliya, Lovaria, Nagor, Chandiya, Meghpar and Kumbharia. The Mistris of these villages have built and developed the infrastructure around the villages in late 1890. However, majority of old houses of Mistris with unique architect were destroyed in the earthquake of 26 January 2001.

References 

Villages in Kutch district